Prorasea pulveralis is a moth in the family Crambidae. It was described by Warren in 1892. It is found in North America, where it has been recorded from California, Colorado and Nevada.

References

Evergestinae
Moths described in 1892